Science and technology in Switzerland play an important role in the Swiss economy, which has very few natural resources that are available in the country. The Swiss National Science Foundation, mandated by the Federal government, is the most important institute for promoting scientific research.

The raw output of scientific research from Switzerland consistently ranks within the top 20. Switzerland was ranked 1st in the Global Innovation Index in 2021

Institutions

Universities

The first university, the University of Basel, was founded in 1460 and today the country has twelve universities.

University of Basel, Basel
University of Bern, Bern
University of Fribourg, Fribourg
University of Geneva, Geneva
University of Neuchâtel, Neuchâtel
University of Lausanne (UNIL), Lausanne
University of Lucerne, Lucerne
University of Lugano, Lugano
University of St. Gallen (HSG), St. Gallen
University of Zurich, Zürich
Swiss Federal Institute of Technology Zurich (ETH Zurich), Zürich
Swiss Federal Institute of Technology in Lausanne (EPFL), Lausanne

Research institutes
 Agroscope Changins-Wädenswil (ACW)
 Agroscope Liebefeld-Posieux (ALP)
 Agroscope Reckenholz-Tänikon (ART)
 European Organization for Nuclear Research (CERN)
 Swiss National Supercomputing Centre (CSCS), Manno
 Swiss Center for Electronics and Microtechnology (CSEM)
 Paul Scherrer Institute (PSI)
 Swiss Light Source
 Swiss Federal Laboratories for Materials Science and Technology (EMPA)
 Swiss Federal Institute of Aquatic Science and Technology (EAWAG)
 Swiss Federal Institute for Forest, Snow and Landscape Research (WSL)
 Swiss Federal Institute for Vocational Education and Training (SFIVET)
 Swiss Graduate School of Public Administration (IDHEAP)
 Idiap Research Institute
 Dalle Molle Institute for Artificial Intelligence Research (IDSIA)
 Swiss Institute of Comparative Law
 Kurt Bösch University Institute (IUKB)
 Federal Institute of Metrology (METAS)
 Federal Office of Meteorology and Climatology (MeteoSwiss)
 Swiss Institute of Bioinformatics (SIB)
 Swiss Finance Institute
 International Institute for Management Development (IMD)
 Graduate Institute of International and Development Studies (IHEID) 
 Sempach Bird Observatory
 Swiss Institute of Allergy and Asthma Research
 Swiss Nanoscience Institute
 Friedrich Miescher Institute for Biomedical Research
 Campus Biotech
 Research Institute of Organic Agriculture

Museums
 The Swiss Science Center Technorama is a unique Science museum in the municipality of Winterthur in the canton of Zürich.

Researchers

With 57% of its researchers coming from other countries, Switzerland is the country with the world highest proportion of foreign researchers.

Scientific

Astronomy and space program

Switzerland Space Agency, the Swiss Space Office, has been involved in various space technologies and programs. In addition it was one of the 10 founders of the European Space Agency in 1975 and is the seventh largest contributor to the ESA budget. In the private sector, several companies are implicated in the space industry such as RUAG Space (payload fairings) or Maxon Motors (mars rovers).

Claude Nicollier is a Swiss Astronaut and flew several missions with the United States space program.

In the field of astronomy, Michel Mayor discovered in 1995, 51 Pegasi B, the first extrasolar planet orbiting a sun-like star.

Mathematics

Leonhard Euler is considered to be the preeminent mathematician of the 18th century and one of the greatest of all time. A statement attributed to Pierre-Simon Laplace expresses Euler's influence on mathematics: "Read Euler, read Euler, he is the master of us all."
Euler made important discoveries in fields as diverse as calculus and graph theory. He also introduced much of the modern mathematical terminology and notation, particularly for mathematical analysis, such as the notion of a mathematical function.

The Bernoulli family produced many notable scientists (Bernoulli number, Bernoulli's principle, Bernoulli's rule...).

Physics
Albert Einstein (naturalized in 1901)  was one of the greatest physicists of all time. He is known for his theory of relativity and specifically mass–energy equivalence, expressed by the equation E = mc2 and also contributed in many other areas (cosmology, solid state physics). Einstein was named "Person of the Century" by Time.

More recently, in 1987, Karl Alexander Müller received the Nobel prize for his work on High-temperature superconductivity.

Furthermore, the CERN (European Organization for Nuclear Research) is located in Switzerland near Geneva.

Chemistry
In the field of chemistry Germain Henri Hess is known for his discovery of the Hess's law. Albert Hofmann discovered the Lysergic acid diethylamide (LSD). Paul Hermann Müller received the Nobel prize for his discovery of the insecticidal qualities of DDT.

Engineering

According to one EPFL source, globally, 4 out of the 20 top labs in the field of AI are located in Switzerland.

Biological and earth sciences
Friedrich Miescher was a Swiss physician who was the first researcher to isolate and characterize Nucleic acid (DNA). Today, a research institute in Basel (the Friedrich Miescher Institute, FMI) is named after him. Emil Theodor Kocher (Nobel Prize in Physiology or Medicine 1909) was known for his work in the physiology, pathology and surgery of the thyroid. The neurologist Walter Rudolf Hess (Nobel Prize in Physiology or Medicine 1949) mapped the areas of the brain that were responsible for the control of several vital bodily functions. The biochemist Werner Arber (Nobel Prize in Physiology or Medicine 1978) is known for his discovery of restriction endonucleases which are essential for all modern biotechnology. The Swiss born Edmond H. Fischer (Nobel Prize in Physiology or Medicine 1992) discovered how reversible phosphorylation works as a switch to activate proteins. Rolf M. Zinkernagel (Nobel Prize in Physiology or Medicine 1996) is famous for his work on the immune system.

Psychology
Carl Jung (1875–1961) was a Swiss psychiatrist and the founder of Analytical Psychology. Jung is considered the first modern psychiatrist to view the human psyche as "by nature religious" and make it the focus of exploration.

See also
 Swiss National Science Foundation
 Swiss Federal Institutes of Technology Domain
 Swiss Innovation Park
 Education in Switzerland
 List of universities in Switzerland
 Swissnex
 Health Valley

Notes and references
 Swiss technology powers Mars mission, Swissinfo.ch
 Oerlikon Space

External links

 Official portal of Swiss universities
 All Swiss university programmes
 myScience.ch Swiss portal for research and innovation
 The State Secretariat for Education and Research
 The Ranking Forum of Swiss Universities